Anthony Stafford Beer (25 September 1926 – 23 August 2002) was a British theorist, consultant and professor at the Manchester Business School. He is best known for his work in the fields of operational research and management cybernetics.

Biography

Early life
Beer was born in Putney, London in 1926. His father was William John Beer, chief statistician at Lloyd’s Register of Shipping. His mother was Doris Ethel Beer, who was born on the same day as his father. At age 17 he was expelled from Whitgift School and enrolled for a degree in philosophy at University College London. But in 1944 he left to join the army, first as Gunner in the Royal Artillery, but he soon received a commission first in the Royal Fusiliers, and then as a company commander in the 9th Gurkha Rifles. He saw service in India and stayed there until 1947. Upon returning to England he was assigned to the Human factors Branch of Operations research at the War Office. In 1949, he was demobilised, having reached the rank of captain.

He dropped the use of his first name "Anthony" when he was about twenty-one and persuaded his brother, Ian Beer, to sign a statement that he would not use the name Stafford which he also was given.

United Steel
In 1956 he joined United Steel and persuaded the management to fund an operational research group, the Department of Operations Research and Cybernetics, which he headed. This was based in Cybor House, and they installed a Ferranti Pegasus computer, the first in the world dedicated to management cybernetics.

SIGMA
In 1961 he left United Steel to start an operational research consultancy in partnership with Roger Eddison called SIGMA (Science in General Management). Beer left SIGMA in 1966 to work for a SIGMA client, the International Publishing Corporation (IPC). He left IPC in 1970 to work as an independent consultant, focusing on his growing interest in social systems.

Cybersyn
In mid-1971, Beer was approached by Fernando Flores, then a high-ranking member of the Chilean Production Development Corporation (CORFO) in the newly elected socialist government of Salvador Allende, for advice on applying his cybernetic theories to the management of the state-run sector of the Chilean economy.

This led to Beer's involvement in the never-completed Cybersyn project, which aimed to use computers and a telex-based communication network to allow the government to maximise production while preserving the autonomy of workers and lower management. Although Cybersyn was abandoned after Allende's death during the Pinochet coup in 1973, Beer continued to work in the Americas, consulting for the governments of Mexico, Uruguay and Venezuela.

Later activity

In the mid-1970s, Beer moved to mid-Wales where he lived in an almost austere style, developing strong interests in poetry and art. In the 1980s he established a second home on the west side of downtown Toronto and lived part of the year in both residences. He was a visiting professor at almost 30 universities and received an earned higher doctorate (DSc) from the University of Sunderland and honorary doctorates from the University of Leeds, the University of St. Gallen, and the University of Valladolid. He was president of the World Organization of Systems and Cybernetics.

Falcondale Collection

In July 1994 Beer ran a residential course at the Falcondale Hotel in Lampeter. Nine sessions were recorded as a video learning resource, and are collectively known as the Falcondale collection. They are available online at the Data Repository of Liverpool John Moores University. The sessions covered art, science and philosophy as well as the practical application of cybernetics in society, government, community, management and business. Transcripts were made of the discussions and are also available from the same repository.

Family life
He was married twice, in 1947 to Cynthia Hannaway, and in 1968 to Sallie Steadman. His partner for the last twenty years of his life was Allenna Leonard, a fellow cybernetician. Beer had five sons and two daughters, one of whom is Vanilla Beer, an artist and essayist. She exhibited with Roger Kohn.

Work

Management cybernetics
According to Jackson (2000) "Beer was the first to apply cybernetics to management, defining cybernetics as the science of effective organization". In the 1960s and early 1970s "Beer was a prolific writer and an influential practitioner" in management cybernetics. It was during that period that he developed the viable system model, to diagnose the faults in any existing organizational system. In that time Forrester invented systems dynamics, which "held out the promise that the behavior of whole systems could be represented and understood through modeling the dynamical feedback process going on within them".

Cybersyn

During the administration of Salvador Allende in Chile, in the early 1970s, Beer was closely involved with a visionary project, Cybersyn, to apply his cybernetic theories in government. The project's ultimate goal was to create a network of computers and communications equipment that would support the management of the state-run sector of Chile's economy; at its core would be an operations room where government managers could view important information about economic processes in real time, formulate plans of action, and transmit advice and directives to managers at plants and enterprises in the field. However, consistent with cybernetic principles and the ideals of the Allende government, its designers aimed to preserve worker and lower-management autonomy instead of implementing a top-down system of centralised control. The system used a network of about 500 telex machines located at enterprises throughout the country and in government offices in Santiago, some of which were connected to a government-operated mainframe computer that would receive information on production operations, feed that information into economic modelling software, and report on variables (such as raw material supplies) that were outside normal parameters and might require attention. The project, implemented by a multidisciplinary group of both Chileans and foreigners, reached an advanced prototype stage, but was interrupted by the 1973 coup d'état.

Viable System Model

The Viable System Model (VSM) is a model of the organisational structure of any viable or autonomous system. A viable system is any system organised in such a way as to meet the demands of surviving in the changing environment. One of the prime features of systems that survive is that they are adaptable. The VSM expresses a model for a viable system, which is an abstracted cybernetic description that is applicable to any organisation that is a viable system and capable of autonomy.

Syntegration and Team Syntegrity
Syntegrity is a formal model presented by Beer in the 1990s and now is a registered trademark. It is a form of non-hierarchical problem solving that can be used in a small team of 10 to 42 people. It is a business consultation product that is licensed out to consulting firms. The term comes from the words "synergistic" and "tensegrity".

POSIWID

Stafford Beer coined and frequently used the term POSIWID (the purpose of a system is what it does) to refer to the commonly observed phenomenon that the de facto purpose of a system is often at odds with its official purpose. In an address to the University of Valladolid, Spain in October 2001, he said "According to the cybernetician the purpose of a system is what it does. This is a basic dictum. It stands for bald fact, which makes a better starting point in seeking understanding than the familiar attributions of good intention, prejudices about expectations, moral judgment or sheer ignorance of circumstances."

Awards
Beer received awards from the Royal Swedish Academy of Engineering Sciences in 1958, from the United Kingdom Systems Society, the Cybernetics Society, the American Society for Cybernetics, and the Operations Research Society of America.

Literature
Stafford Beer wrote several books and articles:
 1959, Cybernetics and Management, English Universities Press.
 1966, Decision and Control, Wiley, London.
 1968, Management Science: The business use of operations research, Aldus Books, London, Doubleday, New York.
 1972, Brain Of The Firm, Allen Lane, The Penguin Press, London, Herder and Herder, USA.Translated into German, Italian, Swedish, French and Russian.
 1974, Designing Freedom, CBC Learning Systems, Toronto, 1974; and John Wiley, London and New York, 1975. Translated into Spanish and Japanese.
 1975, Platform for Change, John Wiley, London and New York. Reprinted with corrections 1978.
 1977, Transit; Poems, CWRW Press, Wales. Limited Edition, Private Circulation.
 1979, The Heart of Enterprise, John Wiley, London and New York. Reprinted with corrections 1988.
 1981, Brain of the Firm; Second Edition (much extended), John Wiley, London and New York. Reprinted 1986, 1988. Translated into Russian.
 1983, Transit; Poems, Second edition (much extended). With audio cassettes: Transit – Selected Readings, and one Person Metagame; Mitchell Communications, Publisher, 2693 Route 845, Carters Point, NB, Canada, E5S 1S2.
 1985, Diagnosing the System for Organizations; John Wiley, London and New York. Translated into Italian and Japanese. Reprinted 1988, 1990, 1991.
 1986, Pebbles to Computer: The Thread; (with Hans Blohm), Oxford University Press, Toronto.
 1994, Beyond Dispute: The Invention of Team Syntegrity; John Wiley, Chichester.

Audio
 1973, Stafford Beer. "Designing Freedom" The 1973 Massey Lectures RADIO CANADA INTERNATIONAL TRANSCRIPTION: E1121 "The Real Threat to all We Most Dear",E1122 "The Disregarded Tools of Modern Man",E1123, "A Liberty Machine in Prototype" E1124, "Science in The Service of Man" 1h 53:30.
 1990, Stafford Beer, "Forty Years of Cybernetics", Gordon Hyde Memorial Lecture at the Cybernetics Society in London, January 1990 (audio file: 1hr 27mins).

Video
 1990, Stafford Beer,  Stafford Beer at Monterrey Tec, March 1990 illustrated by Javier Livas
About Stafford Beer
 1994, Harnden, R and Leonard, A. (Eds.), How Many Grapes Went into the Wine: Stafford Beer on the Art and Science of Holisitic Management; John Wiley, Chichester.
 2002, Rosemary Bechler and Rob Passmore, "Stafford Beer: the man who could have run the world", openDemocracy, 7 November 2002
 2003, Whittaker, David, Stafford Beer: A Personal Memoir; (Includes an interview with Brian Eno) Wavestone Press, Charlbury
 2004, "Ten pints of Beer: The rationale of Stafford Beer's cybernetic books (1959‐94)", Kybernetes, Vol. 33 No. 3/4, pp. 828–842. https://doi.org/10.1108/03684920410523724
 2006, Jonathan Rosenhead, "IFORS' Operational Research Hall of Fame Stafford Beer", in International Transactions in Operational Research Vol 13, nr.6, pp. 577–581.
 2009, Whittaker, David, (Ed.) Think Before you Think: Social Complexity and Knowledge of Knowing; (Selected writings of Stafford Beer with life chronology), Foreword by Brian Eno, Wavestone Press, Charlbury

References

Further reading

External links

 Stafford Beer papers held at Liverpool John Moores University
 Designing Freedom, Regulating a Nation: Socialist Cybernetics in Allende’s Chile 
 Stafford Beer Biography from Vanilla Beer
 
 Biography of Anthony Stafford Beer from the Institute for Operations Research and the Management Sciences

Organizations
 Cybernetics Society Memorial
 The Metaphorum Group – Developing Stafford Beer's Legacy in Management Cybernetics
 Systems & Cybernetics in Organisations (SCiO) – "focus on practice and members support activities." accessed 3 July 2009
 Introduction to the Viable Systems Model and use in Cooperatives
 Web site of the cybersyn project

1926 births
2002 deaths
Alumni of University College London
Cyberneticists
Organizational theorists
People educated at Whitgift School
British operations researchers
Academics of the Victoria University of Manchester
British consultants
British Army personnel of World War II
Royal Artillery soldiers
Royal Fusiliers officers
Indian Army personnel of World War II
Royal Gurkha Rifles officers
Presidents of the International Society for the Systems Sciences